William Daniel Priatko (born October 16, 1931) is a former American football linebacker who played college football for Pittsburgh and professional football in the National Football League (NFL) for the Pittsburgh Steelers in 1957. He appeared in two NFL games.

Early years
Priatko was born in 1931 in North Braddock, Pennsylvania, and attended North Braddock Scott High School. 

From 1951 to 1953, he played college football as a tackle and guars for the Pittsburgh Panthers, though his collegiate career was plagued by injuries.

Priatko later served in the Air Force and played for the Bolling Air Force football team in 1956.

Professional football
Priatko had been drafted by the Green Bay Packers after graduating from Pitt but his professional football career was postponed due to military service. He was signed by the Pittsburgh Steelers as a linebacker in December 1957. He appeared in the last two games of the 1957 season for the Steelers. 

He tried out with the Cleveland Browns in both 1959 and 1960, but did not make the regular season roster. His playing career ended due to knee injuries.

Later years
Priatko later worked for the athletic department at Robert Morris College. Priatko worked in the food and beverage department at Kennywood Park for numerous summers following his retirement. Bill remains active, with a daily regimen of 150 push ups. He is also still heavily involved in the local football programs and has recently been invited by Art Rooney to celebrate the 50th anniversary of Franco Harris’ Immaculate Reception.

References

1931 births
Living people
American football linebackers
Pittsburgh Steelers players
Pittsburgh Panthers football players
People from North Braddock, Pennsylvania
Players of American football from Pennsylvania